Arbignieu is a former commune in the Ain department in the Auvergne-Rhône-Alpes region of eastern France. On 1 January 2016, it was merged into the new commune Arboys en Bugey.

The inhabitants of the commune are known as Arbignolans or Arbignolanes

Geography
The commune is located 4 km south-west of Belley and 30 km north-west of Chambery. It is traversed by the Tour du Bugey trail. It lies in the Appellation d'origine contrôlée (AOC) zone for wine from Bugey with the label "Roussette du Bugey-Arbignieu".

The commune can be accessed on the D69 from Belley in the north-east which continues west to Colomieu. The D100 road also branches from the D49 at the northern edge of the commune and goes south along the eastern side of the commune joining the D10 which passes through the commune from the D992 in the east through the hamlet of Peyzieu then south-west to Saint-Bois. There are three hamlets in the commune other than Arbignieu: Thoys, Slignieu, and Peyzieu. The commune is approximately half farmland and half forest with most of the forest along the western border.

The Furans river forms the eastern border of the commune and then flows east to join the Rhone. The Ruisseau d'Armaille flows from west to east across the commune into the Furans.

Administration

List of mayors of Arbignieu

Population

Sites and monuments
The Ball of Gargantua (stone cups)
The ruins of the Chateau of Longecombe, a former Fief owned by the Luyrieu Family in the 14th century.
The Fortified house of Thoy or Thuey
General Parra's House (18th century) at Sillignieu
The Church of Peyzieu, a hamlet in Arbignieu

Notable people linked to the commune
Césaire Nivière (1799-1879), agronomist, was born in Peyzieu in the current territory of the commune.

See also
 Communes of the Ain department

External links
 Arbignieu on the old National Geographic Institute website 
Arbignieu on Géoportail, National Geographic Institute (IGN) website 
Arbignieu on the 1750 Cassini Map

Notes and references

Notes

References

Former communes of Ain
Populated places disestablished in 2016
States and territories disestablished in 2016